Terry Kennedy (born ), sometimes referred to by his nicknames "TK" or "Compton-Ass Terry", is an American former professional skateboarder. He was sponsored by Baker Skateboards and Pharrell's Billionaire Boys Club. He is the co-founder of Fly Society, a clothing and music brand.

Personal life

Shooting 
In June 2005, Kennedy was shot twice while leaving a party in Long Beach; once in the forearm and once in the jaw. He later recovered.

Murder charge 
Kennedy was arrested on July 27, 2021, at a motel in Oakbrook Terrace, Illinois, for the assault and subsequent death of fellow skateboarder Josiah Kassahun. Kennedy was charged with murder in the first degree.

Kennedy was acquitted of the murder charge on December 2, 2022, but he was convicted of two counts of aggravated battery. On February 28, 2023, Kennedy was sentenced to five years in prison on the battery charge.

Appearances 
Kennedy appeared on Bam Margera's MTV television shows Viva La Bam, Bam's Unholy Union and Rob Dyrdek's MTV show Rob Dyrdek's Fantasy Factory. He also made cameo appearance in Snoop Dogg's chart-topping song "Drop It Like It's Hot", as well as in the video for Mistah Fab's song "Ghost Ride It". Kennedy was also featured on ABC Family's show Switched! He appears in the skateboarding video game Skate and its sequels Skate 2, 3 and Skate It. Kennedy also appeared on the documentary Beef IV to discuss a beef he had with Lupe Fiasco.

Filmography

Videos 
Skate videos that Kennedy has appeared in includes:
Ice Cream Vol. 1
Baker 2G
Summer Tour 2001
Baker 3
Baker Has a Deathwish
Shake Junt's Chicken Bone Nowison
Bake and Destroy

Film

Television

Documentary

References

External links 

1985 births
American skateboarders
Living people
Sportspeople from Long Beach, California
African-American skateboarders
21st-century African-American sportspeople
20th-century African-American people
Long Beach Polytechnic High School alumni